Francesco Janich (27 March 1937 – 2 December 2019) was an Italian footballer who played as a sweeper.

Club career
During his club career, Janich played for Atalanta (1956–58), Lazio (1958–61), and Bologna (1961–72) in Serie A, as well as Lucchese (1972–73) in Serie C. He played for the Coppa Italia winners in 1958 (Lazio) and 1970 (Bologna). He was a member of the 1963–64 Serie A champions, Bologna. Over his entire 448-match career, he never scored a goal. He set a record that he played more games never having received a red card or been expelled from a match.

International career
At international level, Janich earned six caps for the Italy national football team, and played in both the 1962 and 1966 World Cups.

Management career
From 1972 to 1976 and 1978 to 1980, Janich was the general director at Napoli. He spent a year in between as the general director of Lazio. 

He later moved to Bari, but was suspended for six months from football as a result of his involvement in the Totonero 1986 match-fixing scandal.

References

External links
  Profile at enciclopediadelcalcio.it
  Profile at FIGC 

1937 births
2019 deaths
Sportspeople from Udine
Italian footballers
Italy international footballers
1962 FIFA World Cup players
1966 FIFA World Cup players
Atalanta B.C. players
S.S. Lazio players
Bologna F.C. 1909 players
S.S.D. Lucchese 1905 players
Serie A players
Serie C players
Association football sweepers
Footballers from Friuli Venezia Giulia